Acacia elata the cedar wattle or  mountain cedar wattle is a tree found in eastern Australia.

Description
It has deeply fissured bark with a dark brown to black colour at the base of the tree with terete branchlets that are hairy when young.

Taxonomy
The species was first formally described by the botanist George Bentham in 1842 as part of William Jackson Hooker's work Notes on Mimoseae, with a synopsis of species as published in the London Journal of Botany. It was reclassified as Racosperma elatum by Leslie Pedley in 1987, then returned to genus Acacia in 2006. It is sometimes confused with Acacia terminalis. The specific epithet refers to the plants tall, tree-like habit.

Distribution
The species is endemic to coastal areas of New South Wales. Its native range extends from the Budawang Range in the south as afar as the Bellinger River in the north.
It is sometimes escaping from gardens and is considered as a weed in wetter Warren and Jarrah Forest regions in the South West of Western Australia where it grows in loamy lateritic soils. It has also become naturalised in other parts of Australia including Queensland and parts of Victoria.
The habitat is near rainforest and wet sclerophyll forest in various situations. An attractive plant with delicate foliage, it is sometimes seen in cultivation. Its timber is attractive, close-grained, strong and hard, and is suitable for carpentry and turning.

See also
 List of Acacia species

References

Further reading
 
 
 
 

elata
Flora of New South Wales
Ornamental trees
Trees of Australia
Plants described in 1842
Taxa named by George Bentham
Taxa named by Allan Cunningham (botanist)